Soyuz MS-12 was a Soyuz spaceflight which launched on 14 March 2019, carrying three members of the Expedition 59 crew to the International Space Station. The mission ended on 3 October 2019, when Soyuz-MS-12 (carrying Ovchinin, Hague, and spaceflight participant Hazza Al Mansouri) successfully landed.

Crew

Backup crew

Original crew

Original backup crew

Soyuz MS-12 was scheduled to be the debut flight for Hazza Al Mansouri or Sultan Al Neyadi, the first two astronauts from the United Arab Emirates, but this was delayed to flight Soyuz MS-15 following the Soyuz MS-10 mission failure.

Notes

References

Crewed Soyuz missions
2019 in Russia
Spacecraft launched in 2019
March 2019 events in Russia
Spacecraft launched by Soyuz-FG rockets
Spacecraft which reentered in 2019